Legislative elections were held in Mexico on 6 July 2003. Although the National Action Party received the most votes, the Institutional Revolutionary Party won 224 of the 500 seats. Voter turnout was only 41%.

Results

References

Mexico
Legislative
Legislative elections in Mexico
July 2003 events in Mexico